Puente La Amistad de Taiwán (English: "Taiwan Friendship Bridge") spans the Tempisque River, on National Route 18, in Guanacaste, northern Costa Rica. Although generally known as a cable-stayed bridge, it is really a hybrid bridge composed of a cable-stayed span and a pillar-supported bridge. The cable-stayed section has two spans of 170 and 90 metres, supported by an 80-metre-high pylon. The total length of the bridge is 780 metres with eight supporting pillars and the pylon. The bridge was completed in 2003.

The bridge was financed and designed by Taiwan and built primarily by the Taiwanese company MAA, with participation of Costa Rican engineers and workers. It has a particular importance for the province of Guanacaste for it facilitates transit from the capital city of San José. Prior to the construction of the bridge, this route required the use of ferries to cross the Tempisque River, or long alternate land routes. 

Recent Costa Rican studies have found some problems in the structure that have required increased maintenance.

The bridge has been known colloquially as Puente de la Apuñalada (Back stab Bridge) since former Costa Rican President Óscar Arias cut off relations with Taiwan in favour of China. 

Puente La Amistad was damaged on 5 September 2012 by the 2012 Costa Rica earthquake.

References

External links 
 

Bridges in Costa Rica
Cable-stayed bridges
Bridges completed in 2003
Buildings and structures in Guanacaste Province